Here is a list of notable people affiliated with the University of Tehran and Tehran University of Medical Sciences, commonly including alumni, chancellors, current and former faculty members, students, and others.

Academics

 Mostafa Azkia, University of Tehran professor of sociology
 Bahram Beyzai, playwright and filmmaker
 Hossein Bashiriyeh, political scientist, visiting professor at Syracuse University
 Mohammad Bagher Ghalibaf, professor of political geography, Mayor of Tehran
 Mehdi Bazargan, head of the engineering department, former Prime Minister
 Hossein Gol-e-Golab, professor
 Mahmoud Hessaby, professor of physics
 Parviz Jabehdar Maralani, professor of electrical engineering
 Noureddin Kianouri, architect and political leader
 Caro Lucas, Intelligent Control professor
 Abbas Milani, professor, research fellow at the Hoover Institution and Director of Iranian Studies at Stanford University
 Mostafa Moeen, director of the Immunology, Asthma and Allergy Research Institute
 Jamshid Momtaz, professor of law
 Mohammad Mosaddegh, taught in law faculty, former Prime Minister of Iran
 Hossein Nasr, philosopher, Dean of Faculty, and Academic Vice-Chancellor of the University from 1968 to 1972
 Malcolm Nokes MC, nuclear scientist, Institute of Nuclear Science, 1966–69
 Ali Ardashir Larijani, professor of philosophy
 Mohsen Vaziri-Moghaddam, professor of art
 Gholam-Reza Pourmand, professor of urology 
 Sayed Ebrahim Dibaj, professor of philosophy
 Mohammad Ali Sahraian, neurologist and researcher
 Mohammad-Nabi Sarbolouki, professor of biophysics
 Hamid Soltanian-Zadeh, professor of electrical engineering
 Assad Sheikholeslami Sanandaji, theologian and professor at Tehran University
 Mohammad Jalal Abbasi-Shavazi, professor of demography
 Ahmad Kamyabi Mask, professor of theater
 Ali Akbar Velayati, professor of medicine
Siamak Yassemi, Member of The World Academy of Science(TWAS)
 Syed Rahim Moshiri, professor of human geography and physical geography
 Abdul Hamid Zangeneh, professor, dean of the law faculty

Administrative

College founders
 Dr. Mahmoud Hesābi, founder

Chancellors

 1. Dr. Ali-Asghar Hekmat (1934–38)
 2. Dr. Esmāil Merāt (1938–40)
 3. Dr. Isā Sedigh Sedigh Alam (1940)
 4. Dr. Mohammad Tadayyon (1940–41)
 5. Dr. Mostafā Adl Mansour os-Saltaneh (1941–42)
 6. Dr. Ali-Akbar Siāsi (1942–54)
 7. Dr. Manouchehr Eghbāl (1954–57)
 8. Dr. Ahmad Farhād Motamed (fa) (1957–63)
 9. Dr. Jahānshāh Sāleh (fa) (1963–68)
 10. Dr. Fazlollāh Rezā (1968–69)
 11. Dr. Alinaghi Alikhani (1969–71)
 12. Dr. Houshang Nahāvandi (1971–76)
 13. Dr. Ahmad Houshang Sharifi (fa) (1976–77)
 14. Dr. Ghāsem Motamedi (fa) (1977–78)
 15. Dr. Abdollāh Sheibāni (fa) (1978–79)
 16. Dr. Mohammad Maleki (1979)
 17. Dr. Hassan Ārefi (fa) (1980–81)
 18. Dr. Ali Mehdizādeh Shahri (fa) (1981)
 19. Dr. Abolghāsem Gorji (fa) (1981–82)
 20. Dr. Dr. Abbās Sheibāni (1982–83)
 21. Dr. Bahman Yazdi Samadi (fa) (1983–85)
 22. Dr. Mohammad Farhādi (1985)
 23. Esmāil Evini (fa) (1985)
 24. Dr. Hossein Foroutan (fa) (1985–88)
 25. Dr. Mohammad Rahimiān (fa) (1989–93)
 26. Dr. Gholām-Ali Afrouz (fa) (1993–94)
 27. Dr. Mohammad-Rezā Āref (1994–97)
 28. Dr. Mansour Khalili Erāghi (fa) (1997–2002)
 29. Dr. Rezā Faraji-Dānā (2002–05)
 30. Abbās-Ali Amid Zanjāni (2005–07)
 31. Dr. Farhad Rahbar (2007–14)
 32. Dr. Mahmoud Nili Ahmadābādi (2014–21)

Alumni

Nobel laureates
 Shirin Ebadi and faculty member [Nobel Peace Prize 2003].

Scientists and technology
 Seyed Kazem Alavipanah, professor of Remote Sensing
 Lotfi A. Zadeh, inventor of fuzzy logic
 Moslem Bahadori, physician and university lecturer
 Caucher Birkar mathematecian
 Ahmad Reza Dehpour, professor
 Nader Engheta, inventor of Plasmonic cover
 Abolhasan Farhoudi, physician 
 Hassan Farsam, university lecturer
 Mehdi Ghalibafian, civil engineer 
 Hossein Gol-e-Golab, professor
 Mehdi Golshani, university lecturer
 Hamid Jafarkhani, University lecturer
 Ali Javan, inventor of gas laser
 Kourosh Kalantar-zadeh, professor of engineering and inventor
 Kamaloddin Jenab, physics pioneering faculty
 Caro Lucas, Intelligent Control professor
 Alireza Mashaghi, scientist and physician
 Mohammad Ali Mojtahedi, engineer, school and university administrator
 Toffy Musivand, inventor of artificial cardiac pump
 Kaveh Pahlavan, wireless networking researcher
 Samuel Rahbar, discovered HbA1C
 Yahya Rahmat-Samii, Member of the National Academy of Engineering, USA. 
 Alireza Rastegar, inventor, president of the international federation of inventors' associations, winner of ISESCO technology prize in 2003
 Yousef Sobouti, founder of IASBS
 Saeed Sohrabpour, president of the Sharif University of Technology

Intellectuals, scholars, and philosophers
 Jalal Al-e-Ahmad, intellectual
 William Chittick, scholar 
 Elahi Qomshe'i, philosopher and university lecturer
 Dariush Shayegan, philosopher
 Abdolkarim Soroush, philosopher
 Javad Tabatabai, political philosopher
 Parviz Varjavand professor of archeology

Architects
 Foad Rafii, architect
 Hooshang Seyhoon, architect, Dean of College of Fine Arts

Artists and musicians
 Mehrdad Afsari, photographer
 Hossein Alizadeh, musician and university lecturer
 Morteza Avini, photographer
 Rakhshan Bani-E'temad, filmmaker
 Asghar Farhadi, director
 Mansooreh Hosseini, artist
 Haleh Jamali, Iranian artist
 Arghavan Khosravi, Iranian painter and sculptor 
 Abbas Kiarostami, filmmaker
 Behjat Sadr, artist
 Mohsen Vaziri-Moghaddam, professor of art
 Noreen Motamed, painter
 Khosrow Shakibai, actor

Athletes

 Mojtaba Abedini (born 1984), Olympic fencer
 Janet Kohan-Sedq, athlete

Linguists and literary figures
 Fereshteh Ahmadi, writer
 Pegah Ahmadi, poet and literary critic
 Amir-Hossein Aryanpour, dictionarist and translator
 Mohammad-Taqi Bahar, poet, journalist, professor of Persian literature
 Mohammad Ali Eslami Nodooshan, author
 Adib Boroumand, poet, politician and researcher
 Badiozzaman Forouzanfar, linguist
 Hossein Hafezian, political scientist and author
 Razi Hirmandi, translator and writer
 Siavash Kasraie, poet
 Shahriar Mandanipour, author
 Dr. Seyed Ali Mirlohi Falavarjani, Retired Arabic Literature Professor from University of Isfahan, Founder of Islamic Azad University of Falavarjanin 1984
 Mohammad Moin, linguist and university lecturer
 Fereydoun Motamed, linguist
 Ahmad NikTalab, Iranian poet, author, and linguistic
 Ramak NikTalab, Iranian author and translator
 Shahrnush Parsipur, novelist
 Ehsan Yarshater, Iranologist
 Abdolhossein Zarinkoob, Iranologist

Politicians
 Seyyed Mohammad Ali Abtahi, former Vice President 
 Abbas Amir-Entezam,  former Deputy Prime Minister
 Jamshid Amuzegar, Prime Minister
 Mohammad Reza Aref, former Vice President
 Mohammad Beheshti, Ayatollah
 Habibolah Bitaraf, cabinet minister
 Mostafa Chamran, former Vice President and Minister of Defense
 Rahman Dadman, cabinet minister
 Abbas Ahmad Akhondi, current professor, current cabinet minister
 Manuchehr Eghbal, Prime Minister
 Adib Boroumand, leader of National Front
 Hossein Fatemi, former Minister of Foreign Affairs
 Gholam Ali Haddad-Adel, former chairman of the Iranian Parliament
 Fatemeh Haghighatjou, former MP
 Saeed Hajjarian, former Presidential advisor and reformist
 Mustafa Hijri, leader of Democratic Party of Iranian Kurdistan
 Mohammed Ali Jafari, IRGC Chief Commander 
 Mehdi Karroubi, reformist politician and chairman of National Trust Party
 Kamal Kharrazi, cabinet minister, former Minister of Foreign Affairs
 Mohammad Khatami, former President of Iran
 Mohammad Reza Khatami, former secretary-general of the Islamic Iran Participation Front
 Ahmad Khorram, cabinet minister
 Elaheh Koulaei, current professor, former Member of Parliament
 Ali Larijani, speaker of Parliament and former president of IRIB
 Alireza Marandi academic, current Member of Parliament
 Hassan Ali Mansur, Prime Minister
 Mohsen Mirdamadi, Secretary-General of the Islamic Iran Participation Front
 Gholam-Hossein Mohseni-Eje'i, former head of the Ministry of Intelligence and attorney-general
 Heydar Moslehi, current head of Ministry of Intelligence
 Manuchehr Mottaki, former Minister of Foreign Affairs
 Mir-Hossein Mousavi, Prime Minister
 Bijan Namdar Zangeneh, cabinet minister
 Mohsen Nourbakhsh, former Governor of the Central Bank, cabinet minister, former Member of Parliament
 Zahra Rahnavard, politician and artist
 Massoud Rajavi, leader of PMOI
 Abdollah Ramezanzadeh, current professor, spokesman for Khatami's administration
 Mohsen Rezaee, current secretary of the Expediency Council, former IRGC Chief Commander
 Ezzatollah Sahabi, politician
 Yadollah Sahabi, politician
 Kazem Sami, former Minister of Health
 Jafar Sharif-Emami, former Prime Minister of Iran
 Ebrahim Sheibani, Iranian Ambassador, former Governor of the Central Bank
 Mostafa Tajzadeh, former vice minister
 Marzieh Vahid-Dastjerdi, Minister of Health and Medical Education
 Parviz Varjavand, former Minister of Culture
 Ali Akbar Velayati, cabinet minister, former Minister of Foreign Affairs 
 Ebrahim Yazdi, former Deputy Prime Minister, Secretary-General of the Freedom Movement of Iran
 Javad Zarif, former ambassador to the United Nations

Others
 Ahmad Batebi, human rights activist
 Amir Farshad Ebrahimi, human rights activist
 Adel Ferdosipour, journalist, football commentator, television show host, and university professor
 Heydar Ghiai, architect, professor of architecture
 Saeed Hajjarian, journalist
 Darya Safai, women's rights activist
 Mahlagha Mallah, environmental activist
 Nasser Moghadam, former head of SAVAK
 Akbar Mohammadi, student protester 
 Younan Nowzaradan, surgeon, TV personality, and author
 Fazrollah Reza, professor
 Kasra Nouri, lawyer
 Sayed Khatiboleslam Sadrnezhaad, professor of metallurgy at MIT
 Mehdi Sadaghdar, YouTube comedian, electrical engineer
 Ahmad Zeidabadi,  journalist

See also
 Higher education in Iran
 Tehran University
 List of Iranian scholars

References

Peple
Tehran
University